Sarafand al-Kharab was a Palestinian Arab village in the Ramle Subdistrict, located  above sea level,  west of Ramla, in the area that is today northeast of Ness Ziona.

History
Pottery remains from the Early Islamic period (8th-10th century, Umayyad and Abbasid periods) have been found here.

An Arabic inscription on a slab of marble, formerly held in the private collection of Baron d'Ustinow, was found in Sarafand al-Kharab. Dating to the Fatimid period and ostensibly brought to the village from Ashkelon, it states: "The slave of amir al-mu'minin may Allah bless him and his pure ancestors, and his noble descendants. And he was then in charge of ... in the border stronghold of Ashqelon in the month of (?) of Rabi' II of the year 440." AH 440 corresponds to 1048/49 CE.

A vault, dating from the Crusader period, has been found in the village.

Ottoman period
In 1838, Edward Robinson reported that there were two villages by the name of Sarafand in the area, one of which was inhabited by Muslims and the other ruined. Thus, it may be that Sarafand al-Kharab ("Sarafand of the ruins") acquired its name during this period. Both the Sarafand villages belonged to the District of Ibn Humar.

An Ottoman village list of about 1870 counted 22 houses and a population of 107 in Sarfend el Charab, though the population count included men only.

In 1882, the PEF's Survey of Western Palestine (SWP) noted the village on their maps as Khurbet Surafend, and described the archeological remains at the place as being "a tank or birkeh of rubble in cement, resembling those at Ramleh, here exists, with traces of other ruins."

British Mandate
In the 1922 census of Palestine conducted by the British Mandate authorities, Sarafand al-Kharab had a population of 385 Muslims, increasing in the 1931 census to 974; 938 Muslims, 33 Christians and 3 Jews, in a total of 206 residential houses.

Sarafand al-Kharab was one of a number of villages in the Lydda-Ramle district of Mandatory Palestine whose equine population was struck by an epidemic of African horse sickness in 1944, resulting in "stand-still" orders preventing the movement of horses outside of town between September and November 1944 and the deaths of 730 horses in the district.

In the 1945 statistics the village had a population of 1,040; 930 Muslims and 110 Christians, with a total of 5,503 dunams of land. (3,545 Arab-owned, 1,611 Jewish-owned, 347 public lands) In 1944-45, a total of 4,235 dunams were devoted to citrus and bananas and 499 dunams were allocated to cereals; 64 dunams were irrigated or used for orchards, while 33 dunams were classified as built-up, urban areas.

1948, aftermath
By 8 April, Haganah reports mentioned that Palestinian women and children had started evacuating the village. News of the Deir Yassin massacre might have prompted further evacuation.

By September 1948, Sarafand al-Kharab was one village Israeli general Avner considered "suitable" for filling with newly Jewish immigrants, so called olim.

In 1992 the village site was described: "A major part of the village has been destroyed. Many houses, however, remain; no more than six of them, including the house of Muhammad Darwish, are occupied by Israeli families. Most of them have gable roofs and rectangular doors and windows. One house is  two stories and has a slanted roof. The school is used by Israeli students. A pond and a pump house in the orchard of Mahmud Yusuf Darwish are still undamaged. Castor oil (Ricinus) plant and mulberry trees grow on the site. The cemetery is overgrown with cactus plants. The surrounding land are cultivated by Israelis."

Gallery

References

Bibliography

External links
Welcome To Sarafand al-Kharab
Sarafand al-Kharab, Zochrot
Survey of Western Palestine, Map 13: IAA, Wikimedia commons 

Arab villages depopulated during the 1948 Arab–Israeli War
District of Ramla